Renat Nurullayevich Ataullin (born 2 May 1965) is a former Russian professional footballer.

Club career
He made his debut in the Soviet Top League in 1984 for FC Dynamo Moscow. He played 2 games for FC Spartak Moscow in the UEFA Cup 1986–87.

Honours
 Soviet Top League bronze: 1986.
 Soviet Cup finalist: 1989.

References

1965 births
Living people
Soviet footballers
Russian footballers
Soviet Top League players
FC Dynamo Moscow players
FC Spartak Moscow players
FC Lokomotiv Moscow players
FC Torpedo Moscow players
FC Winterthur players
FC Arsenal Tula players
FC Sokol Saratov players
FC Saturn Ramenskoye players
Soviet expatriate footballers
Russian expatriate footballers
Expatriate footballers in Switzerland
Expatriate footballers in Kazakhstan
Russian expatriate sportspeople in Kazakhstan
Footballers from Moscow
Association football midfielders